Glenburnie was a schooner launched at Aberdeen in 1825. She traded with the West Indies and Russia. A ship ran into her in the Irish Sea on 23 August 1835 and she sank within hours.

Career
Glenburnie first appeared in Lloyd's Register (LR) in 1826.

Fate
Glenburnie, Patrick, master, collided with Pitt, off Carlingford, County Louth, on 23 August 1835 and sank in the Irish Sea off the Calf of Man, Isle of Man. Four hours after Glenburnie sank the steamship Solway providentially rescued the crew. Glenburnie, of Dundee, was on a voyage from Saint Petersburg to Liverpool.

Citations

1825 ships
Ships built in Aberdeen
Age of Sail merchant ships of England
Maritime incidents in August 1835